Nevestino Cove is the 1.55 km wide cove indenting for 1.5 km the north coast of Robert Island, South Shetland Islands between Catharina Point and Hammer Point.  Bulgarian early mapping in 2009.  Named after the three settlements of Nevestino situated in southeastern, southern, and western Bulgaria respectively.

Map
 L.L. Ivanov. Antarctica: Livingston Island and Greenwich, Robert, Snow and Smith Islands. Scale 1:120000 topographic map.  Troyan: Manfred Wörner Foundation, 2009.

References
 Nevestino Cove. SCAR Composite Antarctic Gazetteer
 Bulgarian Antarctic Gazetteer. Antarctic Place-names Commission. (details in Bulgarian, basic data in English)

External links
 Nevestino Cove. Copernix satellite image

Coves of Robert Island
Bulgaria and the Antarctic